Haveeru Daily (Dhivehi: ހަވީރ ދުވަހު ނޫސް) was the longest serving daily newspaper in the Maldives, established on January 1, 1979.

History
When local newspaper Moonlight ceased publication on December 9, 1978, Haveeru was registered on December 28, 1978, to fill the gap created by the absence of a newspaper. The first issue of Haveeru was brought out on January 1, 1979, under the proprietorship of Mohamed Zahir Hussain, who is a close friend of the President Maumoon Abdul Gayoom and has been serving Minister level positions of the government since 1978

Name
The name Haveeru symbolises the onset of the cool evening time after the heat of the day, which is also the time when the newspaper is brought out. In Dhivehi literature, "haveeru kurun" means the get-together of poets and writers for literary exchanges. Thus, it was decided that the newspaper's name should also symbolise news, information and literary learning.

Haveeru Daily is the longest serving daily newspaper in Maldives, which marked its 20th anniversary on 1 January 1999.

Haveeru is the first newspaper to be printed by offset. The newspaper's efforts at getting its own printing press dates as far back as 1 April 1981, when a private printer declined to publish the newspaper.

With just a break of one day, seen by many as an April Fools' Day joke, Haveeru rolled off from another press, but this time not in offset, but hand-written on stencils for cyclostyling. The page size was 30x42 cm.
The newspaper first rolled off Haveeru's own offset press on 1 September 1986, with a new enlarged size of 38x55cm. The size was later increased to 42.5x60.5 cm on 1 January 1994.

Many technical setbacks have been overcome with innovation and automation. Haveeru is the first Maldives newspaper to be computerised, in 1985. In also another first, Haveeru began to use Thaana typewriters and Thaana word processors.

The United Nations Environment programme bestowed its Global 500 environmental honour on Haveeru's photojournalist Mohamed Zahir following a series of environmental articles published in Haveeru, which he wrote under the initials "Meemu Zaviyani".

Haveeru is the first newspaper in Maldives to link up with a foreign news agency, the first such link-up being in Kuwait News Agency (KUNA) in 1985. However, the use of radioteletype receivers was not then a successful venture as news reception was often disrupted by unstable weather. Hence, Haveeru turned towards satellite communications, and the newspaper became the first Maldives daily to establish links—via satellite—to get news and information for the print media.

Haveeru also linked up with Agence France-Presse (AFP) in 1992. It was followed by another link-up with Reuters news agency in 1994.

In May 1998, Haveeru established Haveeru Addu Bureau at Addu atoll Feydhoo Island, the first regional news centre by a Maldives newspaper. Two full-time journalists are stationed there to cover events in the southern atolls, and reporting is carried out by sending information via the World Wide Web.

Civil Court on Saturday (2 April 2016) also that Haveeru shut down its online news website as well as all other branches of the company – which's ownership is being disputed over.

Civil Court sent a letter to Chairman of Haveeru, Dr. Mohamed Zahir Hussein, saying that Haveeru needs to comply with the order issued by the court to temporarily halt all of the company's operations which includes using the logo of the company or publishing anything under the name of Haveeru unless in accordance with the procedure stated in the court order; so that the trial remains fair and just.

High Court ruled last September that Haveeru News Agency wasn't just the company's chairman Dr. Mohamed Zahir Hussain's. And that Farooq Hassan from G. Kokkiri and Ibrahim Rasheed Moosa from H. Meerubahuru also had a stake in the company.

Court had ordered Haveeru to pay Farooq and Ibrahim Rasheed one fourth of the profit made by the company to date, each.

Civil Court issued the order for a temporary halt to Haveeru operations on Thursday in response to a lawsuit filed by Farooq and Ibrahim Rasheed.

Court ordered a halt to all bank transactions from any of the company's accounts, and to halt any operation by the company without the involvement of Farooq and Ibrahim Rasheed until the ownership issue was resolved in court.

Haveeru News Agency said that Haveeru Online News would remain operational as the order did not affect it.

Civil Court said that they issued the order based on the damage to Farooq and Ibrahim Rasheed – who hold a combined share of 50 percent, while Zahir from H. Neel Villa holds only 25 percent. Adding that Farooq and Ibrahim Rasheed had the right to request for a temporary halt to Haveeru operations.

High Court had ruled earlier that an agreement had been made between four individuals to set up Haveeru News Agency. And that all four founding members had a stake in the company even now.

The fourth shareholder is Mohamed Naeem from H. Timeless.

The court had said that Farooq and Ibrahim Rasheed still had a stake in the company despite Haveeru News Agency and all subsidiary companies having been renamed.

Haveeru Online News is a media publication run by Haveeru Media Group – a company registered under the name of Zahir's three children – Lubna Zahir Hussein, Leena Zahir Hussein and Vail Zahir Hussein.

Haveeru Online was mostly shut down due to the political influence of President Abdulla Yamin.

References

External links
 Haveeru Daily Online
  Haveeru Daily Online

Newspapers published in the Maldives
Malé
1979 establishments in the Maldives
Newspapers established in 1979